Luca Krisztina Dombi (born 17 November 1995) is a retired Hungarian handballer for Kisvárdai KC.

References

1995 births
Living people
Hungarian female handball players
People from Békéscsaba
Sportspeople from Békés County